The National Australian Convention of Amateur Astronomers (NACAA) is a biennial national forum for amateur astronomy in Australia.

In 1966 two enthusiastic amateur astronomical groups, the James Cook Astronomers Club (now called the Sutherland Astronomical Society) and the Canberra Astronomical Society met in Katoomba to discuss holding an astronomy convention in Australia. The first national Australian astronomy convention was subsequently held over Easter in Canberra in 1967, jointly hosted by the James Cook Astronomers Club and the Pacific Astronomical Society (both Sydney-based organisations). Subsequent conventions were held in Port Macquarie (1968), Ballarat (1969), and Wollongong (1970). After four initial annual conventions, it was agreed to hold the event biennially.

The first convention using the title NACAA was held in Melbourne in 1972, hosted by the Astronomical Society of Victoria. The title was devised by John Perdrix by arranging pieces of cardboard, each with the letter of a suitable word, until an appropriate acronym was found. The pronunciation rhymes with "backer".

The choice of Easter as the date to hold the conventions has been problematical. In the early years, the four-day holiday provided sufficient time for attendees to travel the long distances involved, mostly by car or train. The convention usually began with a welcome reception on the Friday evening and ended on Monday morning with two days of technical sessions in between. Faster transport in later years lead to suggestions to move the event to a three-day holiday weekend instead. The absence of a common holiday weekend shared by all Australian states has prevented this from happening. Instead, the event has expanded in recent years to include additional workshops and symposia, and to encompass most of the four-day holiday.

An interesting aspect of NACAA is that for nearly forty years there was no national steering committee to co-ordinate the event. The organisation of each NACAA was left entirely to the hosting group or society. This arrangement worked surprisingly well for many years, due mainly to the dedication of a small number of regular attendees from the various amateur societies. However, it suffered from problems such as the financial capacity of the hosting society, the level of understanding of the requirements of hosting the event, etc.

A group of regular attendees decided at the 2006 NACAA, following slowly dwindling attendances over the preceding ten years, to create a body to ensure that the tradition of NACAA would continue. NACAA Inc was incorporated in December 2006, only a few months short of forty years after the first national convention. The new body consists of a Secretariat of seven members, assisted by a local organising and a programme committee.

To date, there have been 24 national astronomy conventions in Australia, as detailed below (from Perdix, 2004.)

The Astronomical Society of Australia has since 1973 presented the Berenice and Arthur Page Medal (known as the Berenice Page Medal until 2011) to recognise the contributions to astronomical science by Australian amateur astronomers. The Medal has been presented at the NACAA convention dinner since 1986. The recipients to date are:

As well, the Astral Award, originally sponsored by John Perdrix's Astral Press, has been presented for the best presentation at the convention. The recipients of the Astral Award to date are:

See also 
 List of astronomical societies

References

External links
 Official Web site of the NACAA organizing committee.

Scientific organisations based in Australia
1967 establishments in Australia
Amateur astronomy organizations
Conventions in Australia